The 1948 World Table Tennis Championships women's singles was the 15th edition of the women's singles championship.
Gizi Farkas defeated Vera Thomas-Dace in the final by three sets to two, to win the title.

Results

+ Match replayed after time limit rule inconsistencies (original score was Farkas winning 13-21 9-21 21-9 21-18 29-27)

See also
List of World Table Tennis Championships medalists

References

-
1948 in women's table tennis